Bouchta El Hayani (born 1952 in Taounate) is a Moroccan artist who started his professional career in the 1970s. Since this period he has followed a successful path to become one of the leading and most famous Moroccan artists. First and foremost he is one of the rare Moroccan painters that perfectly master drawing techniques.

El Hayani graduated from the "Ecole des Arts Appliques" in Casablanca then the "École des Beaux-Arts" in Paris. His work has been featured in several exhibitions all over the world.

Bouchta El Hayani currently lives and work in Rabat, Morocco. The artist is also a member of the board of The Moroccan Artists Association (AMAP).

Individual exhibitions
1970:  Centre Culturel Espagnol - Fès (Morocco)
1989 : Faculté - Béni Mellal (Morocco)
1991 : Galerie National Bab Rouah -Rabat (Morocco)
1991 : Galerie l’Atelier - Rabat
1992 : Galerie Flandria - Tanger (Morocco)
1993 : Faculté des Lettres - Fés (Morocco)
1994 : Galerie Rab El Kébir - Rabat
1995 : Jnane Palace - Fés
1997 : Galerie AI Manar - Casablanca (Morocco)
1998 : Galerie Bernanos - Paris (France)
1998 : Galerie Nationale Bab Rouah - Rabat
2000 : Inauguration de la galerie C.D.G. Rabat
2001 : Galerie AI Manar - Casablanca
2002 : Institut Français - Rabat

Group exhibitions
1970 : Salon des artistes Indépendants - Casablanca
1976 : Galerie Nationale Bab Rouah - Rabat
1976 : Passage Souterrain - Casablanca
1977 : Salle des Fêtes - Rabat
1977 : Cinq Peintres à Milan (Italy)
1977 : Bruxelles (Belgium)
1977 : Galerie Structure BS - Rabat
1980 : Galerie Structure BS - Rabat
1981 : Première Biennale de la ville de Tunis - Galerie Yahia - Tunis (Tunisia)
1981 : Festival d’Asilah (Morocco)
1981 : Art marocain, Bordeaux (France)
1982 : Architecture Peinture, Musée des Oudayas - Rabat
1983 : Festival marocain (Disney World), Florida (USA)
1983 : Arts Plastiques méditerranéens, Casablanca
1984 : Semaine Culturelle du Maroc, Dakar (Sénégal)
1985 : Exposition à Laayoune (Morocco)
1985 : Galerie l’Atelier, Rabat
1985 : Faculté des lettres Ben Msik, Casablanca
1985 : Galerie Nationale Bab Rouah, Rabat
1985 : Concours International de Sculpture sur Neige, Québec (Canada)
1986 : 11 Peintres, 11 Poêtes et Hommes de Lettres, Galerie Marsam, Rabat
1987 : Faculté des Lettres, Kênitra (Morocco)
1987 : Musée des Oudayas, Rabat
1987 : 10ème Anniversaire de la Revue AI Assas, Les Oudayas, Rabat *1987 : Rencontre Plasticiens — Artisans et Architectes, Marrakech (Morocco)
1988 : Semaine culturelle marocaine au Caire, Cairo (Egypt)
1990 : Salon d’Automne Musée des Oudayas, Rabat
1990 : Bab El Kébir, Rabat
1990 : Exposition à El Hoceima (Morocco)
1990 : Alliance Franco-Marocaine, Rabat)
1991 : OMDH Galerie Nationale Bab Rouah, Rabat
1992 : Exposition de l’AMAP Galerie Nationale Bab Rouah, Rabat
1993 : Exposition de OMDH (Switzerland)
1994 : Galerie Hamzat Wasl (AI Wassiti), Casablanca (Morocco)
1994 : Des peintres à l’Hôpital d’enfants, Rabat
1994 : Librairie Omar ai khayam - Casablanca
1995 : Galerie Nationale Bab Rouah - Rabat
1996 : Empreintes sur Tapis, Bordeaux (France)
1996 : Empreintes sur Tapis BMCE, Paris (France)
1997 : Semaine marocaine (Monaco)
1997 : Trente années de peinture abstraite au Maroc, Galerie AI Manar, Casablanca
1997 : Empreintes sur Tapis  (United Arab Emirates)
1997 : Professeurs - Peintres BCM, Casablanca
1997 : Professeurs - Peintres Galerie Nationale Bab Rouah, Rabat
1998 : Regard sur l’Art n° XII, Paris
1998 : Cité internationale des arts, Paris
1998 : Galerie Michel Ray, Paris
1999 : Rencontre à Maskite de l’art plastique arabe (Oman)
1999 : Peintres en partage (Espace des Blancs Manteaux), Paris
1999 : Villas des arts, Musée d’art contemporain, Casablanca
1999 : Itinéraires 99 - Mouvement artistique de Levallois, art contemporain (France)
2000 : 1/2000 exposition Jacques cartier (France)
2000 : Peinture contemporaine marocaine : Exposition itinérante (Spain)
2000 : Exposition, Galerie Bab Rouah, Rabat
2000 : Exposition à El Jadida (Morocco)
2000 : Exposition à la faculté d’Aïn-chok, Casablanca
2000 : Artistes peintres à Durban, Durban (South Africa)
2001 : Parcours d’Artistes, Rabat
2001 : Exposition de peintres marocains (Syria)
2002 : Biénale de peintures sur papier (Bangladesh)
2002 : Peinture marocaine (Koweit)
2002 : Mawâzine ateliers portes ouvertes, Rabat
2002 : Arkadi 6éme biénale (Ivory Coast)
2002 : Centre Culturel de l’Agdal, Rabat
2003 : Hommage à Kacimi : Bab Rouah, Rabat
2004 : Exposition “Vision actuelle” à l’Université Al-Akhawaïn, Ifrane (Morocco)
2004 : Hommage à Chaïbia - Al-Jadida (Morocco)
2004 : Exposition G.E.N.A.P à la Cathédrale, Casablanca
2004 : 1ere journée mondiale contre la corruption organisée par Transparency (Morocco)
2004 : Maroc - Galerie Hay Ryad, CDG, Rabat

References

External links
https://web.archive.org/web/20091207001859/http://www.pipale.com/bouchta-el-hayani.htm
http://www.bladi.net/bouchta-el-hayani.html
https://web.archive.org/web/20110418090209/http://www.editmanar.com/peintres/ELHAYAfr
http://www.fondationona.ma/images/pdf/collection.pdf
https://web.archive.org/web/20090217033420/http://www.7-dragons.com/maroc/rabat/hayani.php
https://web.archive.org/web/20100108182748/http://artedemarruecos.com/index.php?mod=cat&cat=1749
http://www.arabafenicenet.it/index.php?option=com_content&task=view&id=570&Itemid=207

http://universes-in-universe.org/eng/intartdata/artists/africa/mar/el_hayani_bouchta
http://www.abc-artgallery.com/el-hayani-Bouchta/
https://web.archive.org/web/20131102102715/http://www.aujourdhui.ma/maroc-actualite/magazine/bouchta-el-hayani-ou-la-mue-des-signes-6432.html
https://web.archive.org/web/20130928001008/http://world.gmw.cn/2013-08/08/content_8549385.htm

1952 births
Living people
Moroccan male artists
People from Taounate
Moroccan male painters
20th-century Moroccan painters
21st-century Moroccan painters